Lac-Granet is an unorganized territory in the Abitibi-Témiscamingue region of Quebec, Canada. It is one of five unorganized territories in the La Vallée-de-l'Or Regional County Municipality.

Until July 6, 1996, Lac-Granet was a large unorganized territory encompassing . On that day, most of it was added to the City of Val-d'Or. It retained only two small non-contiguous areas totalling , of which its western part was a small section of land straddling the north shore of Lake Lemoine and its eastern part is an almost square tract surrounding Lake Granet, mostly part of the La Vérendrye Wildlife Reserve.

On August 29, 2009, Lac-Granet was reduced in size again when its western portion, together with the Unorganized Territory of Lac-Fouillac, were added to the Municipality of Rivière-Héva.  The remaining territory is uninhabited.

Demographics
Population trend:
 Population in 2011: 0
 Population in 2006: 92 (0 after 2009 adjustment)
 Population in 2001: 94
 Population in 1996: 6
 Population in 1991: 5

References

Unorganized territories in Abitibi-Témiscamingue